The Opel Signum is a large front-engine, front-wheel drive, five-passenger, five-door hatchback manufactured and marketed by the German car manufacturer Opel from 2003 to 2008, exclusively over a single generation, derived from the Opel Vectra. Marketed almost exclusively in Europe, a rebadged Signum was marketed in the United Kingdom as the Vauxhall Signum. The Signum used the long wheelbase version of the GM Epsilon platform also used by the Opel Vectra Caravan.

As a very large hatchback with a nearly vertical tailgate, its dimensions placed it between traditional large family cars and executive cars. In most markets, it was also priced accordingly (more expensive than the Opel Vectra, but less than e.g. Audi A6). The Opel Signum was intended to capture a new market segment.

General Motors, Opel's then parent, executed a similar concept in North America of a large hatchback with the related 2004 Chevrolet Malibu Maxx, also derived from the Epsilon platform.

After March 2008, RHD production ended, and both the Opel Signum and the Opel Vectra were replaced with the new Opel Insignia in October of the same year. From the end of 2005, Pierluigi Collina starred in adverts across Europe for the Signum, as well as the Vectra.

Production of the Signum and Vectra C ended in July 2008 for Mainland Europe.

2001 Signum2 Concept 

The Opel Signum2 Concept was a luxury hatchback presented by Opel at the 2001 Frankfurt Motor Show in Germany, and the 2001 Bologna Motor Show in Italy. Design elements from the car were later used in the production Signum, which went into production in February 2003. In November 2000, sketches of the Signum2 were present.

The Signum name was also used on a concept car presented at the 1997 Geneva Motor Show in Switzerland. In August 2001, the name of the car was announced.

The first official pictures of the production Signum were released in August 2002.

Differences compared to Vectra 
This provides for very ample rear legroom. Instead of a traditional three passenger bench seat, the Signum has two separate seats in the rear, offering a range of adjustment capabilities including sliding back and forth (just like the front seats) and reclining backrests.

There is also a very narrow central section, which includes a folding armrest and can also serve as a third seat (the Signum is fitted with three rear headrests and safety belts). The seats can also be folded down individually to increase the cargo space, a system that Opel calls Flexspace.

The Signum shares many body panels (including the complete front part of the body) and interior elements (in particular the complete dashboard and front seats) with the Vectra, but the tailgate and rear fender design is unique to the Signum. The Signum was facelifted along with the Vectra lineup in September 2005, getting a new front fascia design and slight changes elsewhere.

All Signums were made alongside Vectras in Opel's Rüsselsheim plant in Germany.

Engines 
The Signum was offered with a wide range engines it shared with the Vectra. These include:
 1.8 L I4 16V DOHC Ecotec
 2.2 L I4 16V DOHC Ecotec Direct
 2.0 L I4 16V DOHC Turbo Ecotec
 3.2 L V6 24V DOHC L81 (replaced by the 2.8 V6 turbo in 2005)
 2.8 L V6 Turbo 24V DOHC HFV6 (avail. since the 2005 facelift)
 2.0 L I4 16V DOHC DTI Ecotec (replaced by the base 1.9 CDTI in 2005)
 2.2 L I4 16V DOHC DTI Ecotec (replaced by the DOHC 1.9 CDTI in 2005)
 1.9 L I4 8V OHC CDTI (the  version of this engine is available since the 2005 facelift, superseding the 2.0 DTI)
 1.9 L I4 16V DOHC CDTI (avail. since 2005)
 3.0 L V6 24V DOHC CDTI (177hp before 2005)
 3.0 L V6 24V DOHC CDTI (184hp after 2005)

Replacement
In July 2008, both the Signum and Vectra C were discontinued. Although no direct replacement was announced, much of the market territory it once occupied was filled by the Insignia (2008).

References

External links

Signum
Front-wheel-drive vehicles
Euro NCAP large family cars
Hatchbacks
Cars introduced in 2003